The blacktip cardinalfish (Apogon atradorsatus) is a reef fish in the South Pacific. They inhabit rocky reefs at depths from 3–45 m.  They stay under ledge overhangs and other shaded areas on rocky reefs and slopes during the day and feeds in the open at night.

Distribution 
The blacktip cardinalfish is found in Galapagos, Cocos and Malpelo Islands

References

External links
 
 

blacktip cardinalfish
Galápagos Islands coastal fauna
blacktip cardinalfish
Taxa named by Edmund Heller
blacktip cardinalfish